MIAF may refer to:

Melbourne International Arts Festival
Melbourne International Animation Festival
Maunatul Islam Association of Fiji
Marshal of the Indian Air Force, the senior rank in the Indian Air Force
Manchukuo Imperial Air Force
Multi-Image Application Format